The A-0 system (Arithmetic Language version 0), written by Grace Murray Hopper in 1951 and 1952 for the UNIVAC I, was an early compiler related tool developed for electronic computers. The A-0 functioned more as a loader or linker than the modern notion of a compiler. A program was specified as a sequence of subroutines and its arguments. The subroutines were identified by a numeric code and the arguments to the subroutines were written directly after each subroutine code. The A-0 system converted the specification into machine code that could be fed into the computer a second time to execute the said program.

The A-0 system was followed by the  A-1, A-2, A-3 (released as ARITH-MATIC), AT-3 (released as MATH-MATIC) and B-0 (released as FLOW-MATIC).

The A-2 system was developed at the UNIVAC division of Remington Rand in 1953 and released to customers by the end of that year.  Customers were provided the source code for A-2 and invited to send their improvements back to UNIVAC. Thus, A-2 could be considered an example of the result of an early philosophy similar to free and open-source software.

See also
 History of compiler construction

Notes

External links
 Proceedings of the 1954 MIT Summer Session on "Digital Computers - Advanced Coding Techniques, section 7 - A2 Compiler and Associated Routines for use with Univac

References

Procedural programming languages
Programming languages created in 1951